Stylidium humphreysii is a species of trigger plant endemic to desert regions of Western Australia. American botanist Sherwin Carlquist named the species after West Australian amateur botanist Fred Humphreys.

References

External links
 Stylidium humphreysii at the Atlas of Living Australia

humphreysii
Flora of Western Australia